Pink Star (foaled 1904 in Kentucky) was an American Thoroughbred racehorse and was the winner of the 1907 Kentucky Derby. He was a grandson of 1883 Kentucky Derby winner Leonatus and his sire, Pink Coat, was an American Derby winner.

Pink Star won the Kentucky Derby by two lengths over Zal on a very wet track, with the mud being a fetlock deep in some places. Ridden by Andy Minder, his win was a long shot victory and Pink Star was described by contemporary sources as a lumbering and ugly mount. Pink Star finished in last place for the 1907 Latonia Derby, developing a fever and respiratory infection shortly after the running that permanently impacted his breathing.

By May 1908, Pink Star had been gelded and retired from racing due to poor performance and having a bad temperament. He lived the remainder of his life as a plow horse at the farm of J. Hal Woodford in Louisville, Kentucky. He was noted to be dead by 1914.

Pedigree

References

1904 racehorse births
Racehorses bred in Kentucky
Racehorses trained in the United States
Kentucky Derby winners
Thoroughbred family A3